Lance Tan Wei Sheng (born May 14, 1987) is a former Singaporean track and field athlete and track cyclist who competes internationally for Singapore. Tan is a multiple National Champion and record holder in various disciplines. Tan won the bronze medal at the 2011 Southeast Asian Games and competed in the decathlon at the 2015 South East Asian Games, before successfully switching sport to track cycling, representing Singapore at the 2017 South East Asian Games in 3 events.

Track career
In his junior years, Tan competed in the 100m event at the Commonwealth Youth Games held in Bendigo, Australia. He finished 6th in his heat and did not advance to the next round.

Tan is also part of the quartet that holds the current National Junior 4 × 100 m record with a time of 41.28s, set in 2005 at the ASEAN Schools Track and Field Championships.

In 2006, Tan represented Singapore at the IAAF World Junior Championships in Athletics, held in Beijing, China.

Tan, together with Elfi Mustapa, Gary Yeo and Amirudin Jamal won bronze in the 4 × 100 m relay at the 15th ASEAN University Games in 2010, held in Changmai, Thailand. The team finished behind Indonesia and Thailand with a time of 40.62s.

At the 2011 SEA Games held in Palembang, Indonesia, Tan anchored the Singapore team to the bronze medal in the 4 × 400 m relay. It is the first time that Singapore men have finished in the medal placings for the 4 × 400 m relay event at any major Games.

Tan is a former Singapore National Games champion, winning the 400m event in 2012. Tan clinched the silver medal in the 400m Open category at the 2012 National Championships, a feat he repeated in the 2013 edition.

Tan represented Singapore in the decathlon at the 2015 Southeast Asian Games, finishing 8th with a new personal best.

Cycling career
In 2016, Tan switched to track cycling, representing Singapore in the sprint and team sprint at the Asian Cycling Confederation Track Asia Cup, finishing tenth and fourth respectively. Lance also won the yellow jersey in the 2016 OCBC Cycle Road Series, accumulating the most points over four races in the Men's Sports category.

Tan competed at the 2017 South East Asian Games, representing Singapore in Cycling (Track). He competed in the Team Sprint and Team Pursuit, setting a new National record time for both events in the qualifying rounds of 46.883s and 4m:35.246s respectively. Team Singapore eventually finished 4th in the bronze medal finals for both events. In the individual match sprint event, Tan qualified for the quarter finals with a 200m time of 11.083s. He exited the competition in the quarter finals.

Later that year, he won the 1 kilometer time trial event at the Queen's Cup held in Bangkok, Thailand with a time of 1 minute 8.557 seconds.He qualified for the 2018 Asian Cycling Championships, clocking a personal record 1 minute 6.141 seconds and becoming the 2nd fastest Singaporean of all-time over the distance.

Career 
Tan is a research engineer and works at the Agency for Science, Technology and Research since 2012.

References

 

1987 births
Living people
National University of Singapore alumni
Singaporean male sprinters
Southeast Asian Games medalists in athletics
Singaporean people of Chinese descent
Victoria School, Singapore alumni
Victoria Junior College alumni
Southeast Asian Games bronze medalists for Singapore
Competitors at the 2011 Southeast Asian Games